Harry Edward Davis (December 26, 1882 – February 4, 1955) was a lawyer and state legislator in Ohio. He served both houses of the Ohio General Assembly.

He was born in Cleveland. He graduated from Western Reserve University Law School in 1908. He was first elected to  represent Cuyahoga County in the Ohio House of Representatives in 1920 and served four terms. He was elected to the Ohio Senate in 1947 and re-elected in 1953. He married Louise Wormley in 1917.

He was a Freemason and published Freemasonry Among Negroes in America in 1946. Russell Howard Davis was his brother.

Harry E. Davis Jr. High School was named in his honor in 1962.

See also
List of African-American officeholders (1900–1959)

References

1882 births
1955 deaths
Members of the Ohio House of Representatives
20th-century American politicians
Ohio state senators
Politicians from Cleveland
African-American state legislators in Ohio
African-American lawyers
Ohio lawyers
20th-century American lawyers
Case Western Reserve University School of Law alumni
20th-century African-American politicians
African-American men in politics